The 2022 Norwich City Council election took place on 5 May 2022 to elect members of Norwich City Council in England. This was on the same day as other local elections. 13 of 39 seats (one-third) were up for election.

Results summary

Ward results

Bowthorpe

Catton Grove

Crome

Eaton

Lakenham

Mancroft

Mile Cross

Nelson

Sewell

Thorpe Hamlet

Town Close

University

Wensum

References

Norwich
2022
2020s in Norfolk